Eooxylides is a genus of butterflies in the family Lycaenidae. The species in this genus are found in the Indomalayan realm.

Species
Eooxylides tharis (Geyer, [1837])
Eooxylides etias (Distant & Pryer, 1887)
Eooxylides meduana (Hewitson, 1869)

External links
"Eooxylides Doherty, 1889" at Markku Savela's Lepidoptera and Some Other Life Forms

 
Lycaenidae genera
Taxa named by William Doherty